The 2013–14 Färjestad BK season was Färjestad BK's 39th season in the Swedish Hockey League (formerly known as Elitserien), the top division in Sweden.

2013–14 SHL season
2013-14